Carey is an unincorporated community in Greene County, in the U.S. state of Georgia.

History
A variant name was "Litch". A post office called Litch was established in 1909, and remained in operation until 1918. The current name is after James Carey, a railroad agent.

References

Unincorporated communities in Greene County, Georgia
Unincorporated communities in Georgia (U.S. state)